The Forté Profile is a quantitatively validated communication style profiling instrument. A Forté profile identifies a person's natural communication style preferences and strengths, how they have been adapting to a specific individual, team and/or environment, and how they are most likely coming across to others. Forté also identifies an individual's current logic style, current stamina level, and current feelings about goal attainment.

History
Forte was established by CD Morgan III in 1978.

Early research into lexical theory (of or relating to words or the vocabulary of a language as distinguished from its grammar and construction) was done by Galton, (1884) and suggested that personality traits are captured in the words that people use to describe one another. This work eventually led to the Cattel16PF personality profile instrument. This approach has then been basic to the construction of other instruments, including Forté, PI, Big Five, etc.

In the mid-1970s, Morgan reviewed over 200 instruments seeking a strengths-based survey and report. None existed. Morgan began with 185 words or descriptors known to be reflective of the communication styles of dominance, extroversion, patience and conformity based upon his (C. D. Morgan III (1978–1983#) and the earlier works of Thurstone #1934#; Cattell #1950#; Guilford #1954#; Daniels #1973#; and Horst #1968#.

In Morgan's early experimental administrations of the list, the respondents, as they are today, were asked to respond to each adjective based on the 5-point Likert scale under two separate perceptions – “basic self” and “self as others expect me to be”. The 185 descriptors were reduced 30. Using this process provided the position to allocate equivalents with equal loadings to each environment – primary and adapting.

As much of the research focused on the respondent's reaction to words classified as adjectives or descriptors, survey efficiency evolved. Accuracy was proven following the criteria of: validation #construct, content, concurrent, and predictive#, reliability #test and retest#, structural invariance, trait intercorrelations, and intrinsic/extrinsic validity. Continuing field testing procedures are used to refine the wording and uses of the instrument.

Communication style analysis determines, independently, the isolated reactive value of an adjective or descriptor. The next step was to identify a grouping of like-reactive value adjectives or descriptors #i.e. called primary trait loading) and determining what they signify. From the studies of L.L. Thurstone, R.B. Cattell, J.P. and R.B. Guilford, D.W. Fiske, P. Horst #1968# 
, C.D. Morgan III #1978–1983) and Morgan's research accomplished in the decade of the 1970s a grouping of reactive-value adjectives or descriptors were identified as all evidencing high style loadings for each of the primary styles of the tool or instrument. The system of measuring styles obtained from three points of view #i.e. self, adapting environment(s#, and how the individual is perceived by others) was further improved by developing a multiple complexity communication style analysis.

This is, simply, the cluster-sample technique. A sample is taken from identified strength clusters, which allows the computer to project the actual communication/behaviour profile. The Forté survey card is a simulated environment of the real world. The individual taking the survey does not need to understand all the words, as the words are stimuli, to trigger reaction. A sampling, then, has meaning when properly computed.

The field case studies helped describe the behaviour of individuals with similar responses to trait clusters. The system determined the type of and degree of behaviour. Trait intensity was measured. Variance was determined.
The Forté processes and software are updated every six #6) months, reflecting enhancements from both self-perception and observed behaviour validations. Forté is unique in its mathematical weighing of each descriptor, then further intensifying each trait with specific, individual reaction values for the corresponding Likert Scale (1 to 5#).

Systematic tracking of self-descriptive data from large groups of people reveals certain consistencies in response patterns. These consistencies can be considered dimensions along which persons array themselves at defined positions. Such dimensions can be defined as “Introversion-Extroversion,” as presented in the independent research of Cattell #1950# and Eysenck #1947#. This communication style was originally described in the theories of the Swiss physician and psychologist C.G. Jung.
Forté has refined such dimensions to communication style versus “personality” traits.

Communication style dimensions can be used to locate a communication style space within which individuals locate themselves at particular points. Both Cattell and Eysenck found evidence of a two-dimensional space. Cattell even employs as many as 16 “factor” or style dimensions.
Forté identifies over 250,000 profile dimensions via the primary, current adapting and perceiver profiles. Current logic, stamina and goals index data is also provided

See also
 Learning styles
 Myers–Briggs Type Indicator
 Psychometrics
 Personality psychology
 Psychology

References

External links
 Forte Monograph #opens in PDF)

Analytical psychology
Personality tests
Popular psychology